The Hsinchu Zoo is a zoo in East District, Hsinchu City, Taiwan.

History
Established in 1936, the zoo is the oldest zoo in Taiwan. The zoo went under reconstruction and was reopened in December 2019.

Architecture
 Children's Zoo
Chinchilla
Asian water buffalo
Domestic rabbit
Pony
 Primate's Families
Formosan rock monkey
Brown lemur
Grey gibbon
Crab eating macaque
 Bird's Paradise
Sulphur-crested cockatoo
Green peafowl
Common peafowl
Mandarin duck
 Tropical Rain Forest
Malayan sun bear
Orangutan
Bengal tiger
Alligator snapping turtle
 Reptile Kingdom
Yellow margined box turtle
African spurred tortoise
Green iguana
Red eared slider
 Deer's Wonderland
Formosan sika deer
Formosan barking deer

Exhibitions
The zoo currently exhibits more than 300 animals from 100 different species, which includes 70 animals from 23 protected species.

Transportation
The zoo is accessible within walking distance east of Hsinchu Station of Taiwan Railways Administration.

See also
 List of tourist attractions in Taiwan

References

External links

  

1936 establishments in Taiwan
Buildings and structures in Hsinchu
Tourist attractions in Hsinchu
Zoos established in 1936
Zoos in Taiwan